The Arizona Diamondbacks' 2015 season was the franchise's 18th season in Major League Baseball and their 18th season at Chase Field.

Offseason

November 4: Signed Walter Ibarra to a minor league contract.
November 6: Signed Matt Pagnozzi to a minor league contract.
Week of November 13: Signed 3 players to a minor league contract and received Jeremy Hellickson from the Tampa Bay Rays for Andrew Velazquez and Justin Williams.
Week of November 20: Signed 8 players to a minor league contract, promoted 5 from the minors, sent 2 to the minors, and sent Charles Brewer and Mike Bolsinger to the Cleveland Indians and the Los Angeles Dodgers, respectively, for cash.
December 1: Signed J. C. Ramirez to a minor league contract.
December 5: Sent Didi Gregorius to the New York Yankees and received Domingo Leyba and Robbie Ray from the Detroit Tigers in a three-team deal.
December 8: Signed Yasmany Tomas and sent Zeke Spruill to the minors.
December 9: Received Jeferson Mejia and Zack Godley from the Chicago Cubs for Miguel Montero.
December 11: Drafted Oscar Hernández.
Week of December 12: Signed 4 players to a minor league contract and conducted the following trades:
 Sent Eury De La Rosa to the Oakland Athletics for cash.
 Received Myles Smith, Rubby De La Rosa, Allen Webster, and Raymel Flores to the Boston Red Sox for Zeke Spruill and Wade Miley.

December 23: Signed Scott Kalamar to a minor league contract.
December 28: Signed Jordan Pacheco to a minor league contract.
Month of January 2015: Signed 8 players to a minor league contract.
February 2: Signed Gerald Laird to a minor league contract.
February 10: Signed 3 players to a minor league contract.

Regular season

Season standings

National League West

National League Wild Card

Record vs. opponents

Season summary

Game log

|- bgcolor="ffbbbb"
| 1 || April 6 || Giants || 4–5 || Bumgarner (1–0) || Collmenter (0–1) || Casilla (1) || 49,043 || 0–1
|- bgcolor="ccffcc"
| 2 || April 7 || Giants || 7–6 || De La Rosa (1–0) || Vogelsong (0–1) || Reed (1) || 22,626 || 1–1
|- bgcolor="ffbbbb"
| 3 || April 8 || Giants || 2–5 || Heston (1–0) || Hellickson (0–1) || Casilla (2) || 21,642 || 1–2
|- bgcolor="ccffcc"
| 4 || April 10 || Dodgers || 4–3 (10) || Pérez (1–0) || Howell (0–1) || — || 27,404 || 2–2
|- bgcolor="ccffcc"
| 5 || April 11 || Dodgers || 6–0 || Bradley (1–0) || Kershaw (0–1) || — || 37,636 || 3–2
|- bgcolor="ffbbbb"
| 6 || April 12 || Dodgers || 4–7 || Greinke (1–0) || Collmenter (0–2) || Peralta (2) || 29,678 || 3–3
|- bgcolor="ccffcc"
| 7 || April 13 || @ Padres || 8–4 || De La Rosa (2–0) || Cashner (0–2) || — || 19,538 || 4–3
|- bgcolor="ffbbbb"
| 8 || April 14 || @ Padres || 1–5 || Despaigne (1–0) || Hellickson (0–2) || — || 20,102 || 4–4
|- bgcolor="ffbbbb"
| 9 || April 15 || @ Padres || 2–3 || Benoit (3–0) || Delgado (0–1) || Kimbrel (3) || 23,104 || 4–5
|- bgcolor="ccffcc"
| 10 || April 16 || @ Giants || 7–6 (12) || Delgado (1–1) || Romo (0–1) || — || 41,545 || 5–5
|- bgcolor="ccffcc"
| 11 || April 17 || @ Giants || 9–0 || Collmenter (1–2) || Peavy (0–2) || — || 41,550 || 6–5
|- bgcolor="ffbbbb"
| 12 || April 18 || @ Giants || 1–4 || Heston (2–1) || De La Rosa (2–1) || Casilla (4) || 41,756 || 6–6
|- bgcolor="ccffcc"
| 13 || April 19 || @ Giants || 5–1 || Hellickson (1–2) || Hudson (0–2) || — || 41,528 || 7–6
|- bgcolor="ffbbbb"
| 14 || April 21 || Rangers || 1–7 || Tolleson (1–0) || Hudson (0–1) || — || 18,345 || 7–7
|- bgcolor="ccffcc"
| 15 || April 22 || Rangers || 8–5 || Bradley (2–0) || Gallardo (2–2) || — || 17,886 || 8–7
|- bgcolor="ffbbbb"
| 16 || April 24 || Pirates || 1–4 || Cole (3–0) || Collmenter (1–3) || Melancon (4) || 24,427 || 8–8
|- bgcolor="ffbbbb"
| 17 || April 25 || Pirates || 1–2 || Watson (1–1) || Reed (0–1) || Melancon (5) || 38,859 || 8–9
|- bgcolor="ffbbbb"
| 18 || April 26 || Pirates || 0–8 || Liriano (1–1) || Hellickson (1–3) || — || 32,353 || 8–10
|- bgcolor="ffbbbb"
| 19 || April 27 || Rockies || 4–5 || Matzek (2–0) || Anderson (0–1) || Axford (3) || 17,444 || 8–11
|- bgcolor="ccffcc"
| 20 || April 28 || Rockies || 12–5 || Chafin (1–0) || Kendrick (1–3) || — || 18,792 || 9–11
|- bgcolor="ccffcc"
| 21 || April 29 || Rockies || 9–1 || Collmenter (2–3) || Lyles (2–2) || — || 19,633 || 10–11
|-

|- bgcolor="ffbbbb"
| 22 || May 1 || @ Dodgers || 0–8 || Frías (2–0) || De La Rosa (2–2) || — || 50,164 || 10–12
|- bgcolor="ffbbbb"
| 23 || May 2 || @ Dodgers || 4–6 || Nicasio (1–1) || Marshall (0–1) || Hatcher (2) || 43,617 || 10–13
|- bgcolor="ffbbbb"
| 24 || May 3 || @ Dodgers || 0–1 (13) || Howell (1–1) || Marshall (0–2) || — || 48,136 || 10–14
|- bgcolor="bbbbbb" style="text-align:center;
| — || May 4 || @ Rockies || colspan="6" | Postponed (rain) (Makeup date Sept 1)
|- bgcolor="bbbbbb" style="text-align:center;
| — || May 5 || @ Rockies || colspan="6" | Postponed (rain) (Rescheduled as a doubleheader on May 6)
|- bgcolor="ccffcc"
| 25 || May 6 || @ Rockies || 13–7 || Collmenter (3–3) || Matzek (2–1) || — || not given || 11–14
|- bgcolor="ccffcc"
| 26 || May 6 || @ Rockies || 5–1 || Ray (1–0) || Lyles (2–3) || — || 22,621 || 12–14
|- bgcolor="ccffcc"
| 27 || May 7 || Padres || 11–0 || De La Rosa (3–2) || Despaigne (2–1) || — || 16,929 || 13–14
|- bgcolor="ffbbbb"
| 28 || May 8 || Padres || 5–6 || Shields (4–0) || Burgos (0–1) || Kimbrel (9) || 28,677 || 13–15
|- bgcolor="ffbbbb"
| 29 || May 9 || Padres || 4–6 (12) || Quackenbush (1–0) || Delgado (1–2) || — || 27,340 || 13–16
|- bgcolor="ccffcc"
| 30 || May 10 || Padres || 2–1 || Ramírez (1–0) || Cashner (1–6) || Reed (2) || 24,881 || 14–16
|- bgcolor="ffbbbb"
| 31 || May 11 || Nationals || 1–11 || Scherzer (3–3) || Collmenter (3–4) || — || 16,406 || 14–17
|- bgcolor="ccffcc"
| 32 || May 12 || Nationals || 14–6 || De La Rosa (4–2) || Strasburg (2–4) || — || 19,053 || 15–17
|- bgcolor="ffbbbb"
| 33 || May 13 || Nationals || 6–9 || Barrett (3–0) || Reed (0–2) || Storen (10) || 19,026 || 15–18
|- bgcolor="ffbbbb"
| 34 || May 15 || @ Phillies || 3–4 || Araújo (1–0) || Pérez (1–1) || García (1) || 21,383 || 15–19
|- bgcolor="ffbbbb"
| 35 || May 16 || @ Phillies || 5–7 || Williams (3–3) || Bradley (2–1) || Papelbon (9) || 33,649 || 15–20
|- bgcolor="ffbbbb"
| 36 || May 17 || @ Phillies || 0–6 || O'Sullivan (1–2) || Collmenter (3–5) || — || 22,123 || 15–21
|- bgcolor="ccffcc"
| 37 || May 18 || @ Marlins || 3–2 (13) || Reed (1–2) || Cishek (1–4) || Burgos (1) || 17,526 || 16–21
|- bgcolor="ccffcc"
| 38 || May 19 || @ Marlins || 4–2 || Hudson (1–1) || Dunn (0–3) || Burgos (2) || 16,034 || 17–21
|- bgcolor="ccffcc"
| 39 || May 20 || @ Marlins || 6–1 || Anderson (1–1) || Phelps (2–1) || — || 17,158 || 18–21
|- bgcolor="ccffcc"
| 40 || May 21 || @ Marlins || 7–6 || Chafin (2–0) || Dyson (2–1) || Ziegler (1) || 20,692 || 19–21
|- bgcolor="ccffcc"
| 41 || May 22 || Cubs || 5–4 (13) || Delgado (2–2) || Rosscup (1–1) || — || 34,498 || 20–21
|- bgcolor="ffbbbb"
| 42 || May 23 || Cubs || 6–9 || Motte (2–1) || Burgos (0–2) || Strop (1) || 30,502 || 20–22
|- bgcolor="ccffcc"
| 43 || May 24 || Cubs || 4–3 || Hellickson (2–3) || Hammel (3–2) || Ziegler (2) || 39,660 || 21–22
|- bgcolor="ffbbbb"
| 44 || May 25 || @ Cardinals || 2–3 || Rosenthal (1–0) || Ramírez (1–1) || — || 42,853 || 21–23
|- bgcolor="ffbbbb"
| 45 || May 26 || @ Cardinals || 4–6 || García (1–1) || Bradley (2–2) || Maness (3) || 41,107 || 21–24
|- bgcolor="ffbbbb"
| 46 || May 27 || @ Cardinals || 3–4 || Maness (1–0) || Ziegler (0–1) || — || 43,715 || 21–25
|- bgcolor="ccffcc"
| 47 || May 29 || @ Brewers || 7–5 || Reed (2–2) || Broxton (1–2) || Ziegler (3) || 34,276 || 22–25
|- bgcolor="ccffcc"
| 48 || May 30 || @ Brewers || 7–3 || Hellickson (3–3) || Lohse (3–6) || Delgado (1) || 39,552 || 23–25
|- bgcolor="ffbbbb"
| 49 || May 31 || @ Brewers || 7–6  (17) || Garza (3–7) || Nuño (0–1) || — || 32,460 || 23–26
|-

|- bgcolor="ffbbbb"
| 50 || June 1 || Braves || 1–8 || Wood (4–2) || Bradley (2–3) || — || 18,258 || 23–27
|- bgcolor="ccffcc"
| 51 || June 2 || Braves || 7–6 || Chafin (3–0) || Cunniff (2–1) || Ziegler (4) || 17,101 || 24–27
|- bgcolor="ccffcc"
| 52 || June 3 || Braves || 9–8 || Chafin (4–0) || Johnson (1–3) || Ziegler (5) || 17,717 || 25–27
|- bgcolor="ffbbbb"
| 53 || June 4 || Mets || 2–6 || Harvey (6–3) || Leone (0–5) || Familia (16) || 18,954 || 25–28
|- bgcolor="ccffcc"
| 54 || June 5 || Mets || 7–2 || Hellickson (4–3) || Niese (3–6) || — || 24,332 || 26–28
|- bgcolor="ccffcc"
| 55 || June 6 || Mets || 2–1 || Delgado (3–2) || Colón (8–4) || Ziegler (6) || 30,265 || 27–28
|- bgcolor="ffbbbb"
| 56 || June 7 || Mets || 3–6 || deGrom (7–4) || Collmenter (3–6) || Familia (17) || 31,575 || 27–29
|- bgcolor="ffbbbb"
| 57 || June 8 || @ Dodgers || 3–9 || Bolsinger (4–1) || De La Rosa (4–3) || — || 42,167 || 27-30
|- bgcolor="ffbbbb"
| 58 || June 9 || @ Dodgers || 1–3 || Liberatore (2–1) || Ray (1–1) || Jansen (7) || 37,738 || 27–31
|- bgcolor="ffbbbb"
| 59 || June 10 || @ Dodgers || 6–7 || Jansen (1–0) || Hudson (1–2) || — || 47,174 || 27–32
|- bgcolor="ccffcc"
| 60 || June 12 || @ Giants || 1–0 || Anderson (2–1) || Bumgarner (7–3) || Ziegler (7) || 41,952 || 28–32
|- bgcolor="ccffcc"
| 61 || June 13 || @ Giants || 4–2 || Webster (1–0) || Vogelsong (4–5) || Ziegler (8) || 42,006 || 29–32
|- bgcolor="ccffcc"
| 62 || June 14 || @ Giants || 4–0 || De La Rosa (5–3) || Heston (6–5) || Hudson (1) || 41,310 || 30–32
|- bgcolor="ccffcc"
| 63 || June 15 || @ Angels || 7–3 || Ray (2–1) || Weaver (4–7) || Reed (3) || 35,193 || 31–32
|- bgcolor="ffbbbb"
| 64 || June 16 || @ Angels || 1–4 || Richards (7–4) || Hellickson (4–4) || Street (20) || 40,099 || 31–33
|- bgcolor="ccffcc"
| 65 || June 17 || Angels || 3–2 || Anderson (3–1) || Santiago (4–4) || Ziegler (9) || 28,481 || 32–33
|- bgcolor="ffbbbb"
| 66 || June 18 || Angels || 1–7 || Wilson (5–5) || Webster (1–1) || — || 28,942 || 32–34
|- bgcolor="ccffcc"
| 67 || June 19 || Padres || 4–2 || De La Rosa (6–3) || Shields (7–1) || Ziegler (10) || 27,394 ||33–34
|- bgcolor="ffbbbb"
| 68 || June 20 || Padres || 1–8 || Ross (4–7) || Ray (2–2) || — || 33,649 || 33–35
|- bgcolor="ccffcc"
| 69 || June 21 || Padres || 7–2 || Hellickson (5–4) || Cashner (2–9) || Chafin (1) || 35,590 || 34–35
|- bgcolor="ffbbbb"
| 70 || June 23 || @ Rockies || 5–10 || Kendrick (3–9) || Anderson (3–2) || — || 30,079 || 34–36
|- bgcolor="ccffcc"
| 71 || June 24 || @ Rockies || 8–7 || Hudson (2–2) || Axford (1–1) || Ziegler (11) || 30,367 || 35–36
|- bgcolor="ffbbbb"
| 72 || June 25 || @ Rockies || 4–6 || Miller (1–0) || Hudson (2–3) || Axford (13) || 30,568 || 35–37
|- bgcolor="ffbbbb"
| 73 || June 26 || @ Padres || 2–4 || Ross (5–7) || Ray (2–3) || Kimbrel (19) || 30,317 || 35–38
|- bgcolor="ffbbbb"
| 74 || June 27 || @ Padres || 2–7 || Cashner (3–9) || Hellickson (5–5) || — || 40,717 || 35–39
|- bgcolor="ccffcc"
| 75 || June 28 || @ Padres || 6–4 || Anderson (4–2) || Despaigne (3–6) || Ziegler (12) || 32,223 || 36–39
|- bgcolor="ccffcc"
| 76 || June 29 || Dodgers || 10–6 || Burgos (1–2) || Báez (1–1) || — || 24,215 || 37–39
|- bgcolor="ffbbbb"
| 77 || June 30 || Dodgers || 4–6 (10) || Peralta (2–1) || Hernandez (0–1) || Jansen (12) || 22,404 || 37–40
|-

|- bgcolor="ffbbbb"
| 78 || July 1 || Dodgers || 3–4 || Anderson (5–4) || Ray (2–4) || Jansen (13) || 20,277 || 37–41
|- bgcolor="ccffcc"
| 79 || July 2 || Rockies || 8–1 || Hellickson (6–5) || Rusin (3–3) || — || 16,861 || 38–41
|- bgcolor="ccffcc"
| 80 || July 3 || Rockies || 4–3 (10) || Chafin (5–0) || Flande (0–1) || — || 22,449 || 39–41
|- bgcolor="ccffcc"
| 81 || July 4 || Rockies || 7–3 || Corbin (1–0) || Hale (2–4) || — || 42,113 || 40–41
|- bgcolor="ffbbbb"
| 82 || July 5 || Rockies || 4–6 || de la Rosa (6–3) || De La Rosa (6–4) || Axford (14) || 22,996 || 40–42
|- bgcolor="ccffcc"
| 83 || July 7 || @ Rangers || 4–2 || Ray (3–4) || Gallardo (7–7) || Ziegler (13) || 30,995 || 41–42
|- bgcolor="ccffcc"
| 84 || July 8 || @ Rangers || 7–4 || Delgado (4–2) || Harrison (0–1) || Ziegler (14) || 27,390 || 42–42
|- bgcolor="ffbbbb"
| 85 || July 10 || @ Mets || 2–4 || Syndergaard (4–4) || Anderson (4–3) || Familia (25) || 28,243 || 42–43
|- bgcolor="ffbbbb"
| 86 || July 11 || @ Mets || 2–4 || Harvey (8–6) || Corbin (1–1) || Familia (26) || 36,038 || 42–44
|- bgcolor="ffbbbb"
| 87 || July 12 || @ Mets || 3–5 || Niese (5–8) || De La Rosa (6–5) || Familia (27) || 28,259 || 42–45
|- bgcolor=#bbb
| – || July 14 || 86th All-Star Game || colspan=6 | National League vs. American League (Great American Ball Park, Cincinnati)
|- bgcolor="ffbbbb"
| 88 || July 17 || Giants || 5–6 (12) || Vogelsong (7–6) || Delgado (4–3) || — || 26,922 || 42–46
|- bgcolor="ffbbbb"
| 89 || July 18 || Giants || 4–8 || Peavy (1–4) || Anderson (4–4) || Romo (1) || 37,609 || 42–47
|- bgcolor="ffbbbb"
| 90 || July 19 || Giants || 1–2 || Bumgarner (10–5) || Corbin (1–2) || Casilla (24) || 27,173 || 42–48
|- bgcolor="ccffcc"
| 91 || July 20 || Marlins || 3–1 || De La Rosa (7–5) || Phelps (4–6) || Ziegler (15) || 17,668 || 43–48
|- bgcolor="ffbbbb"
| 92 || July 21 || Marlins || 0–3 || Latos (4–6) || Hellickson (6–6) || Ramos (15) || 16,983 || 43–49
|- bgcolor="ffbbbb"
| 93 || July 22 || Marlins || 3–5 || Fernández (3–0) || Ray (3–5) || Ramos (16) || 15,857 || 43–50
|- bgcolor="ccffcc"
| 94 || July 23 || Brewers || 8–3 || Godley (1–0) || Fiers (5–8) || — || 18,011 || 44–50
|- bgcolor="ffbbbb"
| 95 || July 24 || Brewers || 1–2 || Nelson (8–9) || Corbin (1–3) || Rodríguez (22) || 29,956 || 44–51
|- bgcolor="ccffcc"
| 96 || July 25 || Brewers || 2–0 || De La Rosa (8–5) || Jungmann (5–2) || Ziegler (16) || 34,957 || 45–51
|- bgcolor="ccffcc"
| 97 || July 26 || Brewers || 3–0 || Hellickson (7–6) || Garza (5–11) || Ziegler (17) || 24,216 || 46–51
|- bgcolor="ccffcc"
| 98 || July 27 || @ Mariners || 4–3 (10) || Pérez (2–1) || Smith (1–4) || Chafin (2) || 19,532 || 47–51
|- bgcolor="ccffcc"
| 99 || July 28 || @ Mariners || 8–4 || Godley (2–0) || Iwakuma (2–2) || — || 25,106 || 48–51
|- bgcolor="ccffcc"
| 100 || July 29 || @ Mariners || 8–2 || Corbin (2–3) || Hernández (12–6) || — || 32,502 || 49–51
|- bgcolor="ccffcc"
| 101 || July 31 || @ Astros || 6–4 (10) || Hudson (3–3) || Neshek (3–2) || Ziegler (18) || 34,720 || 50–51
|-

|- bgcolor="ffbbbb"
| 102 || August 1 || @ Astros || 2–9 || Keuchel (13–5) || Hellickson (7–7) || — || 36,602 || 50–52
|- bgcolor="ffbbbb"
| 103 || August 2 || @ Astros || 1–4 || McHugh (13–5) || Ray (3–6) || Gregerson (22) || 33,871 || 50–53
|- bgcolor="ccffcc"
| 104 || August 3 || @ Nationals || 6–4 || Godley (3–0) || Fister (4–7) || Ziegler (19) || 30,888 || 51–53
|- bgcolor="ffbbbb"
| 105 || August 4 || @ Nationals || 4–5 || Storen (2–0) || Hernandez (0–2) || Papelbon (19) || 26,112 || 51–54
|- bgcolor="ccffcc"
| 106 || August 5 || @ Nationals || 11–4 || De La Rosa (9–5) || Barrett (3–3) || — || 37,572 || 52–54
|- bgcolor="ffbbbb"
| 107 || August 6 || @ Nationals || 3–8 || Ross (3–3) || Hellickson (7–8) || — || 32,838 || 52–55
|- bgcolor="ccffcc"
| 108 || August 7 || Reds || 2–0 || Anderson (5–4) || Iglesias (2–4) || Ziegler (20) || 26,836 || 53–55
|- bgcolor="ffbbbb"
| 109 || August 8 || Reds || 1–4 || Sampson (1–1) || Ray (3–7) || Chapman (24) || 40,512 || 53–56
|- bgcolor="ccffcc"
| 110 || August 9 || Reds || 4–3 (10) || Collmenter (4–6) || Mattheus (1–3) || — || 28,116 || 54–56
|- bgcolor="ccffcc"
| 111 || August 10 || Phillies || 13–3 || De La Rosa (10–5) || Harang (5–13) || — || 16,495 || 55–56
|- bgcolor="ccffcc"
| 112 || August 11 || Phillies || 13–1 || Hellickson (8–8) || Buchanan (2–7) || — || 19,836 || 56–56
|- bgcolor="ffbbbb"
| 113 || August 12 || Phillies || 6–7 || Nola (3–1) || Anderson (5–5) || Giles (7) || 18,047 || 56–57
|- bgcolor="ffbbbb"
| 114 || August 14 || @ Braves || 2–3 || Teherán (8–6) || Ray (3–8) || Vizcaíno (3) || 31,917 || 56–58
|- bgcolor="ccffcc"
| 115 || August 15 || @ Braves || 8–4 || Corbin (3–3) || Foltynewicz (4–4) || — || 29,624 || 57–58
|- bgcolor="ffbbbb"
| 116 || August 16 || @ Braves || 1–2 (10) || Aardsma (1–1) || Hernandez (0–3)  || — || 20,840 || 57–59
|- bgcolor="ccffcc"
| 117 || August 17 || @ Pirates || 4–1 || Hellickson (9–8) || Cole (14–7) || Ziegler (21) || 27,365 || 58–59
|- bgcolor="ffbbbb"
| 118 || August 18 || @ Pirates || 8–9 (15) || Blanton (5–2) || Hessler (0–1) || — || 24,975 || 58–60
|- bgcolor="ffbbbb"
| 119 || August 19 || @ Pirates || 1–4 || Happ (5–7) || Ray (3–9) || Melancon (38) || 32,088 || 58–61
|- bgcolor="ccffcc"
| 120 || August 20 || @ Reds || 5–4 || Hernandez (1–3) || Badenhop (1–3) || Ziegler (22) || 22,063 || 59–61
|- bgcolor="ccffcc"
| 121 || August 21 || @ Reds || 6–3 || De La Rosa (11–5) || Holmberg (1–3) || Ziegler (23) || 26,757 || 60–61
|- bgcolor="ccffcc"
| 122 || August 22 || @ Reds || 11–7 || Godley (4–0) || DeSclafani (7–9) || Hudson (2) || 36,216 || 61–61
|- bgcolor="ccffcc"
| 123 || August 23 || @ Reds || 4–0 || Anderson (6–5) || Iglesias (3–5) || — || 27,656 || 62–61
|- bgcolor="ffbbbb"
| 124 || August 24 || Cardinals || 3–5 || Lynn (10–8) || Chacín (0–1) || Rosenthal (39) || 19,892 || 62–62
|- bgcolor="ffbbbb"
| 125 || August 25 || Cardinals || 1–9 || García (6–4) || Ray (3–10) || — || 18,720 || 62–63
|- bgcolor="ffbbbb"
| 126 || August 26 || Cardinals || 1–3 || Lackey (11–8) || Hernandez (1–4) || Rosenthal (40) || 17,572 || 62–64
|- bgcolor="ffbbbb"
| 127 || August 27 || Cardinals || 3–5 || Martínez (13–6) || De La Rosa (11–6) || Rosenthal (41) || 22,036 || 62–65
|- bgcolor="ccffcc"
| 128 || August 28 || Athletics || 6–4 || Delgado (5–3) || Gray (12–6) || Ziegler (24) || 30,059 || 63–65
|- bgcolor="ffbbbb"
| 129 || August 29 || Athletics || 2–3 || Rodriguez (4–1) || Chafin (5–1) || Pomeranz (3) || 35,990 || 63–66
|- bgcolor="ffbbbb"
| 130 || August 30 || Athletics || 4–7 (11) || Venditte (1–2) || Ziegler (0–2) || — || 29,576 || 63–67
|- bgcolor="ffbbbb"
| 131 || August 31 || @ Rockies || 4–5 || Castro (2–0) || Ziegler (0–3) || — || 21,386 || 63–68
|-

|- bgcolor="ccffcc"
| 132 || September 1 || @ Rockies || 6–4 || Corbin (4–3) || Castro (0–1) || Hudson (3) || 21,550 || 64–68
|- bgcolor="ccffcc"
| 133 || September 1 || @ Rockies || 5–3 || De La Rosa (12–6) || Oberg (3–4) || Collmenter (1) || 20,411 || 65–68
|- bgcolor="ffbbbb"
| 134 || September 2 || @ Rockies || 4–9 || Brown (1–2) || Delgado (5–4) || Miller (1) || 20,574 || 65–69
|- bgcolor="ffbbbb"
| 135 || September 4 || @ Cubs || 5–14 || Lester (9–10) || Godley (4–1) || — || 36,132 || 65–70
|- bgcolor="ffbbbb"
| 136 || September 5 || @ Cubs || 0–2 || Arrieta (18–6) || Ray (3–11) || Rondón (26) || 40,690 || 65–71
|- bgcolor="ffbbbb"
| 137 || September 6 || @ Cubs || 4–6 || Grimm (3–4) || De La Rosa (12–7) || — || 41,183 || 65–72
|- bgcolor="ccffcc"
| 138 || September 7 || Giants || 6–1 || Corbin (5–3) || Leake (9–8) || — || 28,078 || 66–72
|- bgcolor="ffbbbb"
| 139 || September 8 || Giants || 2–6 || Hudson (7–8) || Anderson (6–6) || — || 18,683 || 66–73
|- bgcolor="ccffcc"
| 140 || September 9 || Giants || 2–1 || Godley (5–1) || Heston (11–10) || Ziegler (25) || 20,576 || 67–73
|- bgcolor="ccffcc"
| 141 || September 11 || Dodgers || 12–4 || Ray (4–11) || Wood (10–10) || — || 35,615 || 68–73
|- bgcolor="ffbbbb"
| 142 || September 12 || Dodgers || 5–9 || Howell (6–1) || De La Rosa (12–8) || — || 42,517 || 68–74
|- bgcolor="ffbbbb"
| 143 || September 13 || Dodgers || 3–4 || Greinke (17–3) || Corbin (5–4) || — || 36,501 || 68–75
|- bgcolor="ffbbbb"
| 144 || September 14 || Padres || 3–10 || Shields (12–6) || Hellickson (9–9) || — || 15,951 || 68–76
|- bgcolor="ccffcc"
| 145 || September 15 || Padres || 6–4 || Delgado (6–4) || Norris (3–11) || Ziegler (26) || 17,531 || 69–76
|- bgcolor="ffbbbb"
| 146 || September 16 || Padres || 3–4 || Cashner (6–15) || Ray (4–12) || Kimbrel (37) || 18,767 || 69–77
|- bgcolor="ccffcc"
| 147 || September 18 || @ Giants || 2–0 || De La Rosa (13–8) || Bumgarner (18–8) || Ziegler (27) || 41,346 || 70–77
|- bgcolor="ccffcc"
| 148 || September 19 || @ Giants || 6–0 || Corbin (6–4) || Leake (10–9) || — || 41,206 || 71–77
|- bgcolor="ffbbbb"
| 149 || September 20 || @ Giants || 1–5 || Hudson (8–8) || Hellickson (9–10) || — || 41,390 || 71–78
|- bgcolor="ccffcc"
| 150 || September 21 || @ Dodgers || 8–4 || Chacín (1–1) || Anderson (9–9) || — || 38,791 || 72–78
|- bgcolor="ccffcc"
| 151 || September 22 || @ Dodgers || 8–0 || Ray (5–12) || Wood (11–11) || — || 41,419 || 73–78
|- bgcolor="ffbbbb"
| 152 || September 23 || @ Dodgers || 1–4 || Hatcher (3–5) || Hernandez (1–5) || Jansen (33) || 46,364 || 73–79
|- bgcolor="ffbbbb"
| 153 || September 24 || @ Dodgers || 3–6 || Kershaw (15–7) || Corbin (6–5) || Jansen (34) || 38,234 || 73–80
|- bgcolor="ccffcc"
| 154 || September 25 || @ Padres || 6–3 || De La Rosa (14–8) || Kelly (0–1) || Ziegler (28) || 24,179 || 74–80
|- bgcolor="ffbbbb"
| 155 || September 26 || @ Padres || 0–3 || Erlin (1–1) || Hellickson (9–11) || Kimbrel (38) || 32,186 || 74–81
|- bgcolor="ccffcc"
| 156 || September 27 || @ Padres || 4–2 || Chacín (2–1) || Shields (13–7) || Ziegler (29) || 27,115 || 75–81
|- bgcolor="ccffcc"
| 157 || September 29 || Rockies || 4–3 (11) || Delgado (7–4) || Brown (1–3) || — || 21,526 || 76–81
|- bgcolor="ccffcc"
| 158 || September 30 || Rockies || 3–1 || Delgado (8–4) || Bettis (8–6) || Hudson (4) || 18,529 || 77–81
|-

|- bgcolor="ccffcc"
| 159 || October 1 || Rockies || 8–6 || Burgos (2–2) || Miller (3–3) || Bracho (1) || 20,826 || 78–81
|- bgcolor="ffbbbb"
| 160 || October 2 || Astros || 5–21 || Keuchel (20–8) || De La Rosa (14–9) || — || 33,218 || 78–82
|- bgcolor="ffbbbb"
| 161 || October 3 || Astros || 2–6 || McHugh (19–7) || Hellickson (9–12) || — || 37,687 || 78–83
|- bgcolor="ccffcc"
| 162 || October 4 || Astros || 5–3 || Hudson (4–3) || Qualls (3–5) || Ziegler (30) || 24,788 || 79–83
|-

|-
| Legend:       = Win       = Loss       = PostponementBold = Diamondbacks team member

Roster

Statistics
Through October 4, 2015

Batting
Note: G = Games played; AB = At bats; R = Runs scored; H = Hits; 2B = Doubles; 3B = Triples; HR = Home runs; RBI = Runs batted in; BB = Base on balls; SO = Strikeouts; AVG = Batting average; SB = Stolen bases

Pitching
Note: W = Wins; L = Losses; ERA = Earned run average; G = Games pitched; GS = Games started; SV = Saves; IP = Innings pitched; H = Hits allowed; R = Runs allowed; ER = Earned runs allowed; HR = Home runs allowed; BB = Walks allowed; K = Strikeouts

Farm system

League Champions: Hillsboro, Missoula

References

External links

 2015 Arizona Diamondbacks season at Baseball Reference
 2015 Arizona Diamondbacks season Official Site

Arizona Diamondbacks season
Arizona Diamondbacks
Arizona Diamondbacks seasons